Đặng Văn Thành (born 30 September 1984) is a Vietnamese former footballer who plays as a forward. He was a member of the Vietnam national football team from 2004 to 2007.

References

1984 births
Living people
People from Haiphong
Association football forwards
Vietnamese footballers
V.League 1 players
Haiphong FC players
Vissai Ninh Bình FC players
Dong Nai FC players
Becamex Binh Duong FC players
Vietnam international footballers